In ATCvet, this subgroup is named "QD05 Drugs for keratoseborrheic disorders".

D05A Antipsoriatics for topical use
In ATCvet, this subgroup is named "QD05A Drugs for keratoseborrheic disorders, topical use".

D05AA Tars

D05AC Antracen derivatives
D05AC01 Dithranol
D05AC51 Dithranol, combinations

D05AD Psoralens for topical use
D05AD01 Trioxysalen
D05AD02 Methoxsalen

D05AX Other antipsoriatics for topical use
In ATCvet, this subgroup is named "QD05AX Other drugs for keratoseborrheic disorders for topical use".
D05AX01 Fumaric acid
D05AX02 Calcipotriol
D05AX03 Calcitriol
D05AX04 Tacalcitol
D05AX05 Tazarotene
D05AX52 Calcipotriol, combinations
D05AX55 Tazarotene and ulobetasol

D05B Antipsoriatics for systemic use
In ATCvet, this subgroup is named "QD05B Drugs for keratoseborrheic disorders, systemic use".

D05BA Psoralens for systemic use
D05BA01 Trioxysalen
D05BA02 Methoxsalen
D05BA03 Bergapten

D05BB Retinoids for treatment of psoriasis
D05BB01 Etretinate
D05BB02 Acitretin

D05BX Other antipsoriatics for systemic use
In ATCvet, this subgroup is named "QD05BX Other drugs for keratoseborrheic disorders for systemic use".
D05BX51 Fumaric acid derivatives, combinations

References

D05